A road in Baltimore County, Maryland, United States; see List of roads in Baltimore County
 A road in North Point, on Hong Kong Island, Hong Kong